The Huaneng Yingkou Power Station is a large thermal power station in China, with installed capacity of .

The station is fuelled by coal, with an efficiency rate of 330.5 grams consumed for each KWh generated.

Nearby Huaneng Yingkou Co-generation Power Plant is a combined heat and power station with installed capacity  consisting of two  generating units, which commenced operation in December 2009.

Adjacent Yingkou Co-generation Photovoltaic Power Plant is a  photovoltaic power station that commenced operation in June 2016.

See also 

 List of coal power stations

References 

Coal-fired power stations in China